Elzbieta Adomaitytė (born 7 January 2002) is a Lithuanian modern pentathlete. She began competing in 2016. Adomaitytė represented Lithuania at the 2022 European Modern Pentathlon Championships, where she won gold medal in the women's relay event and bronze medal in women's team event.

References

External links
 

2002 births
Living people
Lithuanian female modern pentathletes
21st-century Lithuanian women